Mali Trnovac is a village located in the municipality of Bujanovac, Serbia. According to the 2002 census, the town has a population of 343 people. Of these, 339 (98,83 %) were ethnic Albanians, and 1 	(0,29 %) other.

References

Populated places in Pčinja District
Albanian communities in Serbia